Labrador West is a provincial electoral district for the House of Assembly of Newfoundland and Labrador, Canada.  From 1975 to 1996, the district was known as Menihek.

Known as the iron ore capital of Canada with two modern mining communities, Labrador City and Wabush, the district has a strong base of labour support. This district was the first in Newfoundland and Labrador to send a New Democratic member to the House of Assembly, electing party leader Peter Fenwick in a 1984 by-election. The NDP regained the seat in 2019 election, beating the Liberals by a mere two votes and holding the riding in the 2021 general election by a twenty one point margin.

Members of the House of Assembly
The district has elected the following Members of the House of Assembly:

Election results

See also
Labrador City
Labrador West
Labrador Party
New Democratic Party of Newfoundland and Labrador

References

External links 
Website of the Newfoundland and Labrador House of Assembly

Labrador West
Newfoundland and Labrador provincial electoral districts